Shree Ramlu was a Fiji Indian politician who won the Labasa Indian Communal seat for the National Federation Party in the 1994 general election.

He died a few months later.

References 

National Federation Party politicians
Indian members of the House of Representatives (Fiji)
Fijian Hindus
1994 deaths
Telugu people
Year of birth missing
Politicians from Labasa